Katerina Yioulaki (born Aikaterini Yiouvarlaki (Αικατερίνη Γιουβαρλάκη) 27 March 1937 in Athens) is a Greek actress.

Biography

She was born in 1938 in Athens.  She studied at the Dramatic School at the National Theatre of Greece.  Her first appearance in the theater was in 1959 with Dinos Iliopoulos in the work I kiria tou kiriou (Η κυρία του κυρίου).  She felt that she marked her appearance in TV in the beginning in the 1970s in the show I kokoromiali (Η κοκορόμυαλη), in the mid-1980s with I kiria mas ( Η Κυρία μας) and in 1990–1992 in Retire (reh-tee-reh) with Giannis Dalianidis.  She was awarded the Greek Theatrical Writers' Guild Award in 1996.

Filmography

As an actress

Sources
Theodoros Exarchos, Ellines ithopoioi: "I GENIA MAS" (Έλληνες ηθοποιοί " Η ΓΕΝΙΑ ΜΑΣ  = Greek Actors "Our Generations")

External links

1938 births
Living people
Greek film actresses
Actresses from Athens